Sabdalpur is a village in the Habra II CD block in the Barasat Sadar subdivision of the North 24 Parganas district in the state of West Bengal, India.

Geography

Location

Ashoknagar police station has jurisdiction over Habra II CD Block.

Area overview
The area covered in the map alongside is largely a part of the north Bidyadhari Plain. located in the lower Ganges Delta. The country is flat. It is a little raised above flood level and the highest ground borders the river channels. 54.67% of the people of the densely populated area lives in the urban areas and 45.33% lives in the rural  areas.

Note: The map alongside presents some of the notable locations in the subdivision. All places marked in the map are linked in the larger full screen map.

Demographics
According to the 2011 Census of India, Sabdalpur had a total population of 3,049, of which 1,498 (49%) were males and 1,551 (51%) were females. Population in the age range 0–6 years was 306. The total number of literate persons in Sabdalpur was 2,116 (77.14% of the population over 6 years).

Transport
Sabdalpur is on the Iswarigachha-Sahara Road.

Healthcare
Sabdalpur Rural Hospital with 30 beds functions as the main medical facility in Habra II CD Block. There are primary health centres at Bira Ballabhpur (Pukurkona PHC with 10 beds) and Sendanga (Pumlia PHC with 6 beds).

References

Villages in North 24 Parganas district